Latera is a small town and comune in the Province of Viterbo, Lazio, central Italy. 

Situated near Bolsena Lake and Mezzano Lake, is important for volcanic underground activity near the town centre. It has a small rock with a medieval palace by Farnese family, surrounded by medieval stone houses.

History
Latera and its castle are known by documents from around the beginning of the 12th century. It began its long-lasting link with the Farnese family in 1408, when Pope Gregory XII conceded vicardom of the city to Ranuccio Farnese, creating with the namesake city of Farnese a Duchy independent from that of the nearby Castro. The Farnese reigned over Latera until 1650.

Main sights
The Palace of Ranuccio Farnese
The Three Fountains
Museum of Earth, inaugurated in 1999

See also
Wars of Castro

References

External links

Cities and towns in Lazio
Former monarchies of Europe
Former duchies